Shen Jinlong (born October 1956) is a Chinese admiral who served as Commander of the People's Liberation Army Navy (PLAN) from 2017 to 2021.

Biography
Shen was born in Nanhui, Shanghai in October 1956.

Shen's military career began as an enlisted man, whom after receiving a commission advanced in rank to become the commanding officer of a frigate and later a frigate squadron (dadui). He subsequently served as the chief of staff of a frigate division (zhidui) and as commander of Support Base of the North Sea Fleet and president of Dalian Naval Academy.

He was president of Naval Command Academy from 2011 until 2014. In August 2014, he was appointed deputy commander of the South Sea Fleet, and in December was promoted to commander of the fleet, a deputy military region position. On July 29, 2016, he was awarded the rank of vice admiral (zhong jiang) by the Central Military Commission. He became commander of the PLA Navy in January 2017, replacing the retiring Admiral Wu Shengli. In July 2019, Shen was promoted to the rank of admiral (shang jiang).

References

1956 births
People's Liberation Army generals from Shanghai
Living people
Commanders of the People's Liberation Army Navy
Commanders of the South Sea Fleet